Michael (Mihály) Fekete (19 July 1886 – 13 May 1957) was a Hungarian-Israeli mathematician.

Biography 

Fekete was born in 1886 in Zenta, Austria-Hungary (today Senta, Serbia). He received his PhD in 1909 from the University of Budapest (later renamed to Eötvös Loránd University), under the stewardship of Lipót Fejér, among whose students were other mathematicians such as Paul Erdős, John von Neumann, Pál Turán and George Pólya. After completing his PhD he left to University of Göttingen, which in those days was considered a mathematics hub, and subsequently returned to the University of Budapest, where he attained the title of Privatdozent. In addition, Fekete engaged in private mathematics tutoring. Among his students was János Neumann, who was later known in the United States as John von Neumann. In 1922, Fekete published a paper together with von Neumann in the subject of extremal polynomials. This was von Neumann's first scientific paper. Fekete dedicated the majority of his scientific work to the transfinite diameter.

In 1928 he immigrated to Mandate Palestine and was among the first instructors in the Institute of Mathematics at the Hebrew University of Jerusalem. In 1929 he was promoted to professor in the institute. Eventually he succeeded the mathematicians Edmund Landau and Adolf Abraham Halevi Fraenkel in heading the institute. He later moved on to become the dean of Natural Sciences, and between the years 1946–1948 he was Hebrew University Provost.

Among his students were Aryeh Dvoretzky, Amnon Jakimovski and Michael Bahir Maschler.

Awards 
In 1955, Fekete was awarded the Israel Prize for exact sciences.

See also 
Fekete problem
Fekete polynomial
Fekete–Szegő inequality
Fekete's lemma
Fekete constant

References

External links 

Israeli mathematicians
Hungarian emigrants to Israel
Hungarian Jews
People from Senta
Jews in Mandatory Palestine
Israeli Jews
Israeli people of Hungarian-Jewish descent
Israel Prize in exact science recipients
Israel Prize in exact science recipients who were mathematicians
1886 births
1957 deaths
Austro-Hungarian mathematicians